The United Nations Educational, Scientific and Cultural Organization (UNESCO) designates World Heritage Sites of outstanding universal value to cultural or natural heritage which have been nominated by countries which are signatories to the UNESCO World Heritage Convention, established in 1972. Cultural heritage consists of monuments (such as architectural works, monumental sculptures, or inscriptions), groups of buildings, and sites (including archaeological sites). Natural features (consisting of physical and biological formations), geological and physiographical formations (including habitats of threatened species of animals and plants), and natural sites which are important from the point of view of science, conservation or natural beauty, are defined as natural heritage. Sri Lanka ratified the convention on 6 June 1980. 

, Sri Lanka has eight sites on the list. The first three sites, the Ancient City of Polonnaruwa, the Ancient City of Sigiriya, and the Sacred City of Anuradhapura, were listed in 1982. The most recent site, the Central Highlands of Sri Lanka, was listed in 2010. The Central Highlands and the Sinharaja Forest Reserve are natural sites, the other six are cultural. In addition, Sri Lanka has three sites on its tentative list. The country served as a member of the World Heritage Committee in the years 1983–1989.



World Heritage Sites 
UNESCO lists sites under ten criteria; each entry must meet at least one of the criteria. Criteria i through vi are cultural, and vii through x are natural.

Tentative list 

In addition to sites inscribed on the World Heritage List, member states can maintain a list of tentative sites that they may consider for nomination. Nominations for the World Heritage List are only accepted if the site was previously listed on the tentative list. , Sri Lanka has listed three properties on its tentative list.

See also 
 Tourism in Sri Lanka

References 

Sri Lanka
 
World Heritage Sites